The 1999 Asian Women's Volleyball Championship was the tenth edition of the Asian Championship, a biennial international volleyball tournament organised by the Asian Volleyball Confederation (AVC) with Volleyball Association of Hong Kong, China (VBAHK). The tournament was held in Hong Kong, China from 21 to 26 September 1999.

Pools composition
The teams are seeded based on their final ranking at the 1997 Asian Women's Volleyball Championship.

Preliminary round

Pool A

|}

|}

Pool B

|}

|}

Final round
 The results and the points of the matches between the same teams that were already played during the preliminary round shall be taken into account for the final round.

Classification 5th–8th

|}

|}

Championship

|}

|}

Final standing

References
JVA
Results

International volleyball competitions hosted by Hong Kong
A
Asian women's volleyball championships
Voll